Tomepampa District is one of eleven districts of the province La Unión in Peru.

See also 
 Kuntur Sayana
 Saraqutu
 Sunqu Urqu

References

Tomepampa
http://portalcotahuasi.com/tomepampa.html